Madge Tennent (June 22, 1889 – February 5, 1972) was a naturalized American artist, born in England, raised in South Africa, and trained in France.  She ranks among the most accomplished and globally renowned artists ever to have lived and worked in Hawaiʻi.

A child prodigy, Tennent spent her formative teenage years in Paris, where she honed technical mastery under the tutelage of William-Adolphe Bouguereau at the Académie Julian; simultaneous exposure to the city's leading avant-garde artists, including Paul Cézanne, Pierre-Auguste Renoir, and Pablo Picasso, stoked her pioneering vision. Having served as an art educator in South Africa, New Zealand, and British Samoa, she settled in Honolulu with her husband and children in 1923.

Tennent's prolific output spanned paintings, drawings, and sculpture. Her reverent fascination with Hawaiian women inspired the sweeping aesthetic quest that would culminate in an iconic signature style: enormous paintings of voluptuous female figures that synthesized brilliant, swirling hues into graceful, harmonious compositions. A prominent figure on the international circuit, Tennent exhibited to critical and popular acclaim around the world. At the time of her death, many critics considered her the most important individual contributor to Hawaiian art in the 20th century.

Biography

Early life

Madge Tennent was born Madeline Grace Cook in Dulwich, England, the first of two daughters born to Arthur and Agnes Cook. Her father was an architect, seascape painter, and fine craftsman in woodcarving, while her mother owned, edited, and wrote for a weekly magazine titled South African Women in Council. Having settled in Cape Town by 1894, the Cooks took a lively interest in comparative creeds that embraced many religions, as well as in matters of psychic and astrological trend. Madge and her sister Violet were nurtured in this stimulating, creative environment, learning to read and write at an early age. Agnes was an accomplished pianist who taught Madge, in particular, to play. Her parents’ efforts to promote tolerance among various races and creeds left a lasting impression on her.

Paris (1902-1906)

Although Madge attended an English boarding school and, later, a French Convent school in Paris, she otherwise had little formal schooling. Her talent for drawing prompted her parents to enroll her at age twelve in the Cape Town School of Art, where classes were limited to drawing from casts, still life, and portraiture; within a year, she had mastered and surpassed the curriculum. Her parents thus decided to relocate the family to Paris, where Madge could pursue more advanced training in the disciplines of art.

At the Académie Julian, Madge was quickly identified as a child prodigy and invited to study under William-Adolphe Bouguereau, a prominent artist-educator closely identified with Academic art.  In competition with older students from five academies, a 13-year-old Madge placed fifth with her full length charcoal drawing of a nude model. Her drive to draw and paint well was sustained without pause as she worked long hours each day. With her family she often visited the Louvre, where she could check her own progress in the realm of the masters.

Return to Cape Town and Marriage (1907-1915)

The Cooks were steeped in the cultural life of Paris, but due to financial reverses, they returned to Cape Town in 1907. Madge was soon appointed the headmistress in art for several girls' schools in different cities of South Africa and the director of a government art school in Cape Town. At age 18, she began exhibiting her work widely. In response to one such exhibition, a critic observed, "One must be a mystic to recognize the meaning with which the pictures are invested."

By 1913, Madge had established her own art school and resumed her piano recitals. Attending one was Hugh Cowper Tennent, a chartered accountant from New Zealand who was stationed in Cape Town with the Natal Light Horse regiment. One of 11 children born to Robert and Emily Tennent, Hugh courted the 26-year-old Madge for three months following their introduction on 25 July 1915. The two were married and, shortly thereafter, embarked to New Zealand.

New Zealand and British Samoa (1915-1923) 

Again Madge directed an art school, having been appointed head instructor at the Government School of Art in Woodville, the village where Madge and Hugh lived while he awaited further military orders. On 11 June 1916, she gave birth to Arthur Hugh Cowper Tennent, the first of two sons. When orders came, Hugh was posted to France in support of the allied effort in World War I. Madge relocated to her parents-in-law's home in Invercargill for the duration of Hugh's service abroad.

Hugh returned from France in 1917 with a badly wounded arm.  An accountant by trade, he was offered a position as treasurer to the government of British Samoa, which he chose to accept.  The Tennents lived in Samoa for six years, during which time Madge was able to indulge a fascination with the native people of Polynesian descent.  Madge was able to devote much of her time to drawing charcoal portraits of Samoans.

Honolulu (1923-1972)

In 1923, en route to England to enroll their sons in school, the Tennents stopped over in Honolulu. It was to have been a brief stop, but they soon were persuaded by members of the local cultural elite, including poet Don Blanding, to stay.  Madge Tennent was immediately taken with the Hawaiian people, and she would devote the remainder of her life to rendering them in paintings and prints.

Artistic Evolution & Style

While her husband worked to build his accountancy firm, Madge Tennent supported her family as a portrait artist. With remarkable success, she drew countless child and adult portraits, mainly of Caucasian families. There was little challenge in this, however, and her imagination was already ablaze with the beauty she recognized in the Native Hawaiian and variously multiracial peoples she longed to portray. A book of Gauguin reproductions sparked her impetus to expand upon her study, research, drawing, and painting. With a strong insight into the Polynesian aesthetic, she envisioned Hawaiian kings and queens as "having descended from gods of heroic proportion, intelligent and brave, bearing a strong affinity to the Greeks in their legends and persons." It was this reverent vision of the Hawaiians that she would endeavor to convey to the world.

Influences of seminal European antecedents conspicuously permeated Madge Tennent's transitional paintings of the late 1920s and early 1930s, such as Bathers (1926), Hawaiian Girl (1926), Girl with Apples (1926), Makuahine (1927), and Olympia of Hawaii (with Apologies to Manet) (1927).  Olympia of Hawaii, in the collection of the Honolulu Museum of Art, exemplifies Tennent's enchantment with color and use of the bright, warm hues endemic to Hawaiʻi.  She adapted line and form to the appropriately vivid medium of oil. The majestic, explicitly Polynesian women that would figure in Mrs. Tennent's iconic imagery surfaced in works such as Reclining Girl (1929) and Three Filipino Ladies (1930), each a synthesis of European modernism's languid, architectonic femininity with Tennent's own racial fixation. Generously applying paint with a palette knife, she avoided sensuousness in the representation of skin texture, instead imbuing the trademark sense of strength and grandeur tinged with fragility apparent in Holoku Ball and Hawaiian Singer (early 1930s). Just as Mrs. Tennent constructed her wahine layer by layer in paint, she built her canvases to equally monumental proportions; when standard issue could no longer satisfy her vision, she sewed pieces of canvas together to attain the desired size.

By the mid-1930s, Madge Tennent's works had evolved into the mammoth oils of majestic Hawaiian women that remain her signature to this day. She tapped a brilliant, decidedly tropical color palette to create Hawaiians Hanging Holoku, Lei Queen Fantasia, and Local Color (all 1934), depicting native women engaged in lei-making, dancing, and similarly island-specific activities. Hawaiian Bride (1935), one of the few paintings with which Mrs. Tennent was "almost satisfied," marked a turning point in the development of her distinctive style; there, as in the concurrent Girl in Red Dress (1935) and Two Lei Sellers (1936), she achieved an ethereal intensity with softer hues and blurred, iridescent forms. In these later works, whirling wisps of complementary oils fuse the figures to their floral surroundings, visualizing the resilient bonds that Madge Tennent perceived between the body and spirit of Hawaii. In the summer of 1935, all six canvases traveled from Honolulu to Europe for a series of major one-woman exhibitions that established Mrs. Tennent's presence on the global art circuit.

Her refusal to feel entirely satisfied with her output, even in the face of widespread acclaim, reflected her conviction that the artist “evolves through conscious effort.” This conscious evolution became strikingly apparent in the early 1940s, whereupon Mrs. Tennent's famously vibrant, swirling colors and thick, granular strokes gave way to a subdued monochrome, as in Three Musicians Subdued in Harmony (1940). Thereafter followed paintings in shades of ocean blues and earthy island sepias on linen, such as Hawaiian Three Graces (1941), Three Hawaiian Women (1941), and Three Hawaiians in a Library (1943). Three Hawaiian Women, in the collection of the Honolulu Museum of Art, demonstrates this stark contrast to the polychromatic blaze of her earlier works and evidences her lasting belief that “every true artist knows that his work must evolve or die […] therefore, the moment he has perfected some type of style of expression peculiar to himself he must move on or he becomes academic.” Working on a smaller scale in the 1950s, for example, Madge Tennent executed a series of portraits featuring Hawaiian aliʻi in oils, prints, and watercolors; she treated Hawaiian royalty as descendants from the gods, possessed of heroic proportions and serene facial features that conveyed “a gentleness that tends to make a predominance of convex lines, only seen in the great art of the world.” Until her death in 1972, Tennent would continuously diversify across media and scale, but never once did she stray from or grow tired of her beloved Hawaiian subjects.

Creed

 To make heavy forms lyric.
 To discover fourth-dimensional interest and to make it animate, bringing it down from its imaginative dimensions to a three-dimensional technique in color, form, and rhythm.
 To attempt something profound and universal in a usual and typical Hawaiian subject.
 To organize and paint a big subject as one would conduct a symphony. The two in a last analysis being very much akin.
 To make color perform, where possible, the work of tone.
 To give vibration and chloral movement, as in nature.
 To build up color shapes in a three-dimensional painting much as one builds with bricks in a three-dimensional world.
 To make an aesthetic, not a static, expression in paint, and to keep a large organization in paint, lyric.
 To paint each picture in its most suitable rhythm, these rhythms to be a personal expression, used to give a sense of perpetual vibration or motion.
 To compose with light, apart from color, making light as important as color.
 To achieve through a fundamental and traditional procedure and a personal technique, in an abstract way (so called), the story of the Hawaiian people.
 To paint without thought of pleasing, to keep faith with my furthest discrimination in art, and to make no compromise aesthetically.

International Recognition

A renowned art educator as well as painter of modern figurative canvases of Hawaiian subjects, Madge Tennent had a distinguished career based primarily in Hawaii from where she sent paintings to the mainland United States for exhibitions in New York City and Chicago between 1930 and 1939.  She was among the first artists to embrace native Hawaiians as a primary subject matter, whom she depicted as large and robust with audacious, swirling forms and colors.  Two Sisters of Old Hawaii, in the collection of the Hawaii State Art Museum, is an early example of her large paintings of Hawaiian women.  Her influence was increased by her association with the Honolulu Museum of Art in its early days, where she was a frequent lecturer, and where she was included in most of the Academy's early group shows.

Mainland and international exhibitions include:

 Ferargil Galleries, New York - 1930
 California Palace of the Legion of Honor, San Francisco - 1932
 12th International Watercolor Exhibition, Art Institute of Chicago - 1932
 Society of American Artists Annual, Rockefeller Center, New York - 1931, 1932, & 1936
 Northwest Annual Exhibition, Seattle Art Museum - 1933
 Bernheim-Jeune, Paris - 1935
 Wertheim Gallery, London - 1935 & 1937
 Painters & Sculptors of Los Angeles, Los Angeles County Museum of Art - 1937
 Civic Center, San Francisco - 1938
 Oakland Museum of California Annual - 1938
 Drake Hotel, Chicago - 1939
  Contemporary Art of the United States, New York World's Fair - 1939-1940

Critical reception 

Writing for the London Evening Standard, Eric Newton praised Tennent's 1937 one-woman exhibition at the Wertheim Gallery: One can see that it would be the easiest thing in the world for Mrs. Tennent to draw and paint with literal accuracy, and leave it at that. She has the equipment of an exceptionally gifted artist, and to prove it she includes one or two heads done with an academic, though masterly touch, which gives one no more than the physical features of her sitters. But luckily she feels the art has other things to do than hold mirrors up to nature. It is plain that Honolulu has set her imagination on fire, and her later paintings are symbolic, rather than representational. Vivid prismatic colors, and a gargantuan sense of form, are the dominant features of her later style. Not so much massive as fantastically round, clad in voluminous draperies of almost painfully intense color, give one a sense of tropical exuberance not confined to paint […] her art could be described as an experiment in amplitude.

Legacy
During the mid-1950s, Madge Tennent suffered the first of several heart attacks, prompting her to shift from large-scale undertakings on canvas to smaller works on paper. She was diagnosed with a permanent heart ailment in 1958, and by 1965 she had discontinued working and moved into the Maunalani Hospital near Manoa. After a decade of gradually declining health, Tennent died in Honolulu on 5 February 1972. Her funeral was held at St. Andrew's Cathedral in Honolulu. Three days after her death, the Hawaiʻi State Senate commemorated the artist's vision, accomplishments, and influence:

IN HONOR OF THE LATE MADGE TENNENT

WHEREAS, Madge Tennent, one of Hawaii's most important artists, died on February 5, 1972 in the 82nd year of her long and eventful life; and

WHEREAS, better than any artist to date, Madge Tennent was able to capture and honestly express in her many paintings and drawings the subtle charm and quiet grace and dignity of the Hawaiian people; and

WHEREAS, Madge Tennent was also a warm and generous person, who gave often and generously of her works to friends and to charity; and

WHEREAS, Madge Tennent, having spent a half century in Hawaii, leaves behind a rich legacy of art, which shall forever belong to Hawaii; and therefore,

BE IT RESOLVED by the Senate of the Sixth Legislature of Hawaii, Regular Session of 1972, that this body solemnly notes the passing of a great artist and person.

Following Tennent's death, numerous cultural luminaries opined on her outstanding contribution to the cultural landscape of Hawaii. Fellow island artist Isami Doi wrote that Tennent died, "still, twenty years ahead of all of us." "Even if the Hawaiians were to vanish as a race, they would live forever in the paintings of Madge Tennent," remarked noted Native Hawaiian scholar and author John Dominis Holt. "No other artist in Hawaii has so consistently and eloquently painted, sketched, and drawn the Hawaiian Woman as has Tennent. In the physical form of a larger Hawaiian woman, she established the basis upon which to build a lasting, universal aesthetic statement. She gave her life effort and her great talent to the elaboration of this vision." In 2005, Tennent was named one of the 100 most influential contributors to the city of Honolulu. Her large-scale oils on canvas and board have reportedly sold for over $1 million.

The Fine Arts Museums of San Francisco, the Hawaii State Art Museum, the Honolulu Museum of Art, the National Museum of Women in the Arts (Washington, D. C.), and the Victoria and Albert Museum (London) are among the public collections holding works by Madge Tennent. The single largest intact collection of her works resides at the Isaacs Art Center, which in 2005 was named caretaker of the Tennent Art Foundation.

Tennent's Hawaiian Pattern (1927) was featured in Encounters with Paradise, a seminal survey of Hawai‘i art mounted at the Honolulu Museum of Art in 1992; from July 2014 until January 2015, this important early work appeared alongside two other Tennent canvasses in the museum's Art Deco Hawai‘i exhibition. In September 2016, the Isaacs Art Center mounted a sweeping retrospective of Tennent's work that spanned over 40 works produced over five decades of her life. Titled Rhythm in the Round: The Modernism of Madge Tennent, the exhibition was the largest public show of the artist's work since 1976.

Notes

Footnotes

References
 Bruce, Lois Margaret, Madge Tennent: Colorful Hawaiians, Hawaii Origin, 1976 
 Charlot, Jean, The Donald Angus Collection of Oil Paintings by Madge Tennent, Contemporary Arts Center of Hawaii, Honolulu, 1968
 Department of Education, State of Hawaii, Artists of Hawaii, Honolulu, Department of Education, State of Hawaii, 1985, pp. 7–14
 Forbes, David W., Encounters with Paradise: Views of Hawaii and its People, 1778-1941, Honolulu Academy of Arts, 1992, 210-268
 Forbes, David W., He Makana, The Gertrude Mary Joan Damon Haig Collection of Hawaiian Art, Paintings and Prints, Hawaii State Foundation of Culture and the Arts, 2013, pp. 59–61
 Haar, Francis and Prithwish Neogy, Artists of Hawaii: Nineteen Painters and Sculptors, University of Hawaii Press, 1974, 9-15
 Hartwell, Patricia L. (editor), Retrospective 1967-1987, Hawaii State Foundation on Culture and the Arts, Honolulu, Hawaii, 1987, p. 47
 Holt, John Dominis, Literary Conversations with Madge Tennent, Ku Pa'a Incorporated, Honolulu, 1989
 Hustace, Mollie M. and Justin M. Sandulli, Rhythm in the Round: The Modernism of Madge Tennent, Kamuela, HI: Hawaii Preparatory Academy, 2016
 Morse, Morse (ed.), Honolulu Printmakers, Honolulu, HI, Honolulu Academy of Arts, 2003, p. 22, 
 Papanikolas, Theresa and DeSoto Brown, Art Deco Hawai'i, Honolulu, Honolulu Museum of Art, 2014, p. 126-128
 Sandulli, Justin M., Troubled Paradise: Madge Tennent at a Hawaiian Crossroads, Durham, NC: Duke University, 2016
 Tennent, Arthur, Madge Tennent, My Mother, Arthur Tennent, Honolulu, 1982
 Tennent, Madge and Arthur Tennent, The Art and Writing of Madge Tennent, Island Heritage, Honolulu, 1977 
 Tennent, Madge, Madge Tennent: Autobiography of an Unarrived Artist, Columbia University Press, New York, 1949
 Tennent, Madge G. Cook, Madge Tennent Miscellany, Tennent Art Foundation, 1966
Wagerman, Virginia, Larger Than Life, Hana Hou! (Hawaiian Airlines, 5.5), October/November 2002, https://hanahou.com/5.5/larger-than-life
Hustace, James J.  Painters and Etchers of Hawaii-A Biographical Collection-1780-2018, Library of Congress (C)

External links
Madge Tennent Artists of Hawaii: Season 1, Episode 2 (PBS Hawaii: 1984)
Pioneering Art of Madge Tennent on Display at the Isaacs Art Center (Big Island Video News: 2016)

1972 deaths
1889 births
20th-century English painters
20th-century English women artists
Emigrants from the United Kingdom to Cape Colony
Académie Julian alumni
English women painters
Painters from Hawaii
Painters from London
People from Dulwich
South African expatriates in France
South African emigrants to the United States